John Maurice Edward Lloyd (7 May 1844 – 21 January 1910) was a Welsh first-class cricketer and barrister.

Lloyd was born in January 1844 at Llanmerewig, Montgomeryshire, the second of three sons of the Reverend John Lloyd (1810–1891), of Castell Forwyn, Abermule, Montgomeryshire, rector of Llanmerewig from 1844 to 1878, and his wife Marianne (d. 1850), daughter of Edward Davies, of Rhydwhiman. The Lloyd family had lived in the town of Montgomery for centuries, descending from Maurice Lloyd, Capital Bailiff of Montgomery in 1686. His elder brother, William Llewellyn Lloyd, succeeded their father as head of the family. 

Lloyd was educated at Marlborough College, matriculating at Trinity College, Oxford in 1864, where he graduated B.A. in 1869, M.A. in 1872. While studying at Oxford, he made a single appearance in first-class cricket for Oxford University against the Gentlemen of England at Oxford in 1866. Opening the batting in the Oxford first-innings, he was dismissed for 6 runs by Isaac Walker. A student of Lincoln's Inn, he was called to the bar in April 1872, where he specialised as an equity draftsman and conveyancer.  

In 1898, Lloyd married Alice Norton, daughter of Major-General Charles Stirling Dundas, son of the 26th Chief of Clan Dundas. Her mother, Mary Louisa, was daughter of Sir Norton Joseph Knatchbull, 10th Baronet. Their elder son was John Davies Knatchbull Lloyd, an antiquarian researcher and public servant. Lloyd died at his home, Plas Trefaldwyn, Montgomery- owned by the Lloyd family since the 1700s- in January 1910.

References

External links

1844 births
1910 deaths
People from Paddington
People educated at Marlborough College
Alumni of Trinity College, Oxford
Welsh cricketers
Oxford University cricketers
Members of Lincoln's Inn
Welsh barristers